The Bird’s Wing (Dypterygia scabriuscula) is a moth of the family Noctuidae. The species can be found in Europe and the western Palearctic (Asia Minor and Armenia).

Technical description and variation

D. scabriuscula L. (= pinastri L., tripterygia Esp.) (38 f). Forewing brown black; the inner margin narrowly and the postmedian space below vein 3 whitish, with the veins and intervals marked with pale olive brown, often some pale brown suffusion also about vein 6; a fine black streak from base below cell;the lines and edges of stigmata black; inner line with 4 angles outwards, that below vein 1 long and acute; outer line oblique outwards to 5, forming a projection between 4 and 5, then insinuate to middle of inner margin: claviform stigma long and narrow; orbicular oval, flattened, sometimes touching the large reniform: terminal area with black streaks between veins; subterminal line visible only below vein 2, the anal angle beyond it blackish; hindwing fuscous. Larva redbrown, marbled and dotted with darker; dorsal line finely white with brown edge; lateral lines broadly pale, dark-edged above, crossed by a series
of oblique brown stripes; head brown with black streaks.
 The wingspan is 32–37 mm.

Biology
The moths flies from April to August depending on the location.

The caterpillars feed on Rumex and Polygonum aviculare.

References

External links

Bird’s Wing on UKmoths
Fauna Europaea
Lepiforum.de
Vlindernet.nl 

Hadeninae
Moths described in 1758
Moths of Asia
Moths of Europe
Taxa named by Carl Linnaeus